China's Next Top Model is a Chinese reality TV series, based on the international version and spin-off to the original, America's Next Top Model.

The show was produced by Chinese television subscription channel Sichuan Satellite TV and it is filmed in Shanghai, the casting was held in selected cities of China - Shanghai, Beijing, Chengdu, and Guangzhou. It began airing on January 9, 2009.

Among the prizes for this season was a contract with Elite Model Management, an appearance on the cover of Marie Claire China and a campaign for Max Factor.

Ultimately, 21-year-old Meng Yao from Harbin was declared the winner of the competition.

Contestants
(ages stated are at start of contest)

Episodes

Episode 1

Casting episode.

Episode 2

First call-out: Mo Jia Qi
Bottom two: Hu Lu Lu & Zhang Cai  	
Eliminated: Zhang Cai

Episode 3

First call-out: Meng Yao 
Bottom two: Li Muo & Zhang Yang	   	
Eliminated: Li Muo

Episode 4

First call-out: Lili Anna
Bottom two: Hu Lu Lu & Zhang Yang	   	
Eliminated: Hu Lu Lu

Episode 5

First call-out: Meng Yao
Bottom two: Mo Jia Qi & Tan Jie	   	
Eliminated: Tan Jie

Episode 6

First call-out: Mo Jia Qi
Bottom two: He Xin & Lili Anna	   	
Eliminated: Lili Anna

Episode 7

First call-out: He Xin
Bottom two: Wang Shan & Zhang Yang	   	
Eliminated: Zhhang Yang

Episode 8

First call-out: Meng Yao
Bottom two: He Xin & Wang Shan	   	
Eliminated: Wang Shan

Episode 9
Recap episode.

Episode 10

First call-out: Meng Yao
Bottom two: He Xin & Mo Jia Qi	   	
Eliminated: He Xin
Final two: Meng Yao & Mo Jia Qi 
China's Next Top Model: Meng Yao

Summaries

Call-out order

 The contestant was eliminated
 The contestant won the competition

 In episode 1, the group of girls was reduced to 10 that would move on to the main competition. This first call-out does not reflect their performance that first week.
 Episode 9 is the recap episode.

Average call-out order
Final two are not included.

Photo shoot guide
Episode 1 photo shoot: Student ID card (casting)
Episode 2 photo shoot: Lingerie by the pool
Episode 3 photo shoot: Beauty shots with creatures
Episode 4 photo shoot: Makeovers
Episode 5 photo shoot: Girls as boys
Episode 6 photo shoot: Marie Claire magazine covers
Episode 7 photo shoot & commercial:  Max Factor  
Episode 8 photo shoot: Music genres
Episode 10 photo shoot: Max Factor beauty shots

Makeovers
Lu Lu: Side parted with layers
Jie: Cut short
Lili: Long, close-knit curls
Yang: Cut short
Shan: Dyed blonde and bangs added
Xin: Long, loose curls
Jia Qi: Bangs with red-dye finishing
Yao: Cut shorter with longer bangs and straightening

External links
Official Site

2009 Chinese television seasons
China's Next Top Model